Keeaumoku Pāpaiahiahi (1736–1804) was a Hawaiian high chief and the father of Kaahumanu. He was the principal agent in elevating Kamehameha I to the throne of Hawaii and served in a capacity similar to commander in chief or Prime Minister.  He is sometimes referred to as Keʻeaumoku II Pāpaʻiahiahi numbering Keʻeaumoku Nui as the first and his son as the third.

Life
His father was Hawaii island chief Keawepoepoe and his mother was Kūmaaikū. He was called Keeaumoku by the people which literally means the Island-climbing Swimmer. Keeaumoku was a warlike and ambitious chief of the Kona district of Hawaii island. He was among the first of five Kona chiefs to back Kamehameha I against his cousin Kiwalao. The four other Kona chiefs were: High Chief Kalua‘apana Keaweāheulu, Kamehameha’s uncle; Kekūhaupio, Kamehameha's warrior teacher; Kame'eiamoku and Kamanawa, half-brothers of Keeaumoku on their father's side.

In 1782, at the Battle of Mokuōhai near Keei, Kona, Keeaumoku led Kamehameha's warriors to victory, and Kīwalaō was killed.
Kīwalaō was wearing an ahu ula (red feather cloak), which then became the property of Kamehameha (this feathered cloak is now in the collection of the Bishop Museum). One account states that the injured Keeaumoku Pāpaiaheahe crawled to Kīwalaō, who also had been injured, and then Keeaumoku Pāpaiaheahe slit the neck of Kīwalaō with a leiomano (shark-tooth weapon).
He was commander-in-chief of Kamehameha's forces in most of his war compaigns. He served as Counsellor of State and was Kamehameha's prime minister.

On his first visit of his Expedition of 1791–1795, Keeaumoku convinced George Vancouver to trust Kamehameha, leading to two return visits and an important alliance with the British. Vancouver, who spelled his name "Kahowmotoo", left some goats and returned the next year to find them thriving.

While preparing for an invasion of Kauai island against King Kaumualii, an epidemic called mai ōkuu (likely cholera) infected King Kamehameha and many of his troops, killing thousands. Many of Kamehameha’s warriors died from the disease. Among them was Keeaumoku on March 21, 1804.

Family
He married Nāmāhānai Kaleleokalani, the widow queen of Kamehamehanui Ailuau, the late king of Maui. Namahana's brother, King Kahekili II, who was King of Maui, was displeased that Namahana had taken Keeaumoku for her husband, and he became Keeaumoku's enemy. The people, including Namahana, stood in great fear of him, so she hid their first-born child in a cave at Hāna, on Maui, at the very foot of the old battle hill, Kauiki. This child was Kaahumanu who would one day be the most powerful woman in the Hawaiian Kingdom. He married his daughter to Kamehameha when she was only 13 year of age and she soon became Kamehameha's favourite wife. He and Namahana gave birth to two other daughters Kaheiheimālie and Namahana Piia who also married Kamehameha. His eldest son, also named Keeaumoku, served as Governor of Maui under the name George Cox Keeaumoku, and his youngest son John Adams Kuakini served as Governor of Hawaii Island and Oahu. He and his children were a most influential family of Hawaii in the beginning days of the Hawaiian Kingdom. Keeaumoku's great-grandsons Kamehameha IV, Kamehameha V and Lunalilo ruled Hawaii from 1855 to 1874.

References

1736 births
1804 deaths
Royalty of the Hawaiian Kingdom
Hawaii (island)
Hawaiian Kingdom politicians
Native Hawaiian politicians
Governors of Maui
Hawaiian military personnel